Nicolás Todero (born 15 April 1979) is a former professional tennis player from Argentina.

Biography
Todero was born in La Plata, son of Jorge, a tennis coach who later served as Argentina's Fed Cup captain for several years.

Professional career
Based in Florida, Todero began competing professionally in 1998. At a Futures event in Vero Beach in 1999 he beat a young Andy Roddick in straight sets. It was Roddick first appearance in a Futures main draw, which gives Todero the distinction of being the first player to ever defeat the American in a professional match. In 2000 Todero started featuring at Challenger level, a format he won many matches in over the years without ever progressing to a final. He was however runner-up in the doubles at two Challenger tournaments as a doubles player and won ten singles titles in Futures. In 2002 he qualified for his only ATP Tour event, the Swiss Open in Gstaad, where he lost in the first round to Austria's Stefan Koubek. He narrowly missed out on qualifying for the 2008 Wimbledon Championships, with a five set loss to Simon Stadler in the final qualifier. His last year on the professional circuit was in 2009.

Coaching
Todero now coaches for the USTA, through which he has worked closely with Stefan Kozlov and Frances Tiafoe. A former coach of Jesse Levine, Todero has been a USTA national coach since 2010.

References

External links
 
 

1979 births
Living people
Argentine male tennis players
Argentine tennis coaches
Sportspeople from La Plata
Argentine emigrants to the United States
Tennis people from Florida